Fernando Eleta Airport  is an airport serving the village of Pedro de Cocal on Isla Pedro Gonzalez, one of the Pearl Islands of Panama.

See also

Transport in Panama
List of airports in Panama

References

Airports in Panama